Gdynia Arena (known in Poland as Hala Sportowo-Widowiskowa Gdynia) is an indoor arena that is located in Gdynia, Poland. It is the home of the professional Euroleague Basketball club Arka Gdynia. The arena opened on December 22, 2008, and it has a seating capacity of 5,500 for basketball games.

The arena hosted the final draw of the 2019 FIFA U-20 World Cup.

References

External links
 Official Website 

Indoor arenas in Poland
Sport in Gdynia
Buildings and structures in Gdynia
Sports venues in Pomeranian Voivodeship
Basketball venues in Poland